St. Lina Aerodrome  was a registered aerodrome located  west of St. Lina, Alberta, Canada.

References

Defunct airports in Alberta
County of St. Paul No. 19